The Gesse is a  long river in the Hautes-Pyrénées, Haute-Garonne and Gers départements, southwestern France. Its source is at Arné, on the plateau de Lannemezan. It flows generally northeast. It is a left tributary of the Save into which it flows at Espaon.

Départements and communes along its course
This list is ordered from source to mouth: 
Hautes-Pyrénées: Arné
Haute-Garonne: Boudrac
Hautes-Pyrénées: Bazordan
Haute-Garonne: Saint-Loup-en-Comminges, Nizan-Gesse, Gensac-de-Boulogne, Blajan, Boulogne-sur-Gesse, Péguilhan, Lunax, Nénigan, Saint-Ferréol-de-Comminges, Puymaurin, Molas
Gers: Tournan
Haute-Garonne: Boissède
Gers: Cadeillan, Sabaillan, Sauveterre, Espaon,

References

Rivers of France
Rivers of Haute-Garonne
Rivers of Gers
Rivers of Hautes-Pyrénées
Rivers of Occitania (administrative region)